Rebyachyevo is a rural locality (a village) in Domshinskoye Rural Settlement, Sheksninsky District, Vologda Oblast, Russia. The population was 11 as of 2002.

Geography 
Rebyachyevo is located 31 km south of Sheksna (the district's administrative centre) by road. Orlovka is the nearest rural locality.

References 

Rural localities in Sheksninsky District